The Andean mountain cat (Leopardus jacobita) is a small wild cat native to the high Andes that has been listed as Endangered on the IUCN Red List because fewer than 1,500 individuals are thought to exist in the wild. It is traditionally considered a sacred animal by indigenous Aymara and Quechua people.

The Andean mountain cat was first described by Emilio Cornalia who named it in honor of Jacobita Mantegazza. It is a monotypic species.

Characteristics
The Andean mountain cat has ashy-gray fur, a grey head, face and rounded ears. The nose and lips are black with the areas around them being white; two dark brown lines run from the corners of the eyes across the cheeks. There are some black spots on the forelegs, yellowish-brown blotches on the flanks, and up to two narrow, dark rings on the hind limbs. The long bushy tail has six to nine rings, which are dark brown to black. The markings of juveniles are darker and smaller than those of adults.

Its pads are covered with hair.

The Andean mountain cat and pampas cat look similar. This makes it difficult to identify which cat is observed and makes correct estimations of populations problematic. This can be especially difficult when attempting to gain correct information from the observations of individuals that have seen one of these cats but are not aware to look for specific features to distinguish between the two.

Distribution and habitat

The Andean mountain cat lives only at high elevations in the Andes. This terrain is arid, sparsely vegetated, rocky and steep showing that the Andean Mountain Cat prefers a temperate and terrestrial habitat.

Its habitat in the Andes is fragmented by deep valleys, and its preferred prey, mountain viscachas (Lagidium) occur in patchy colonies. Across this range, the level of genetic diversity is very low.

Behavior and ecology 
The Andean cat is sympatric with the pampas cat and the cougar. The viscacha makes up 93.9% of the biomass consumed in the Andean cat's diet while the pampas cat depends on it for 74.8% of its biomass consumption. Both cats depend on a specific prey to make up a large portion of their dietary needs. In some areas, the mountain viscacha makes up 53% of the Andean cat's prey items despite making up the vast majority of the biomass that it consumes. This is because the mountain viscacha is significantly larger in biomass than the other prey animals that the Andean cat hunts. Other prey and food groups include small reptiles, birds, and other small mammals such as tuco-tuco. They also hunt frequently during the same periods. During one study, both the Andean cat and the pampas cat were seen most frequently during moonless nights; the second most sightings of these cats were during full moons.

Based on residents' observations of Andean cats in coupled pairs with their litters, it is thought that the mating season is in the months of July and August. Due to kittens also being seen in the months of April and October, the mating season could also extend into November or December, although not much information is known about their breeding habits. A litter usually consists of one or two offspring born in the spring and summer months. This is also common in other species that have their young when food resources are increasing, which can influence the survival rate of the young.

Threats
The Andean cat is threatened by such factors as habitat loss and degradation, hunting, and disease.

Conservation
The Andean Cat is also listed on the IUCN Red List, the US Federal List, and the CITES Appendix I. It is protected in all the countries of its range.

The Andean Cat Alliance was formed in 2003 by representatives from Argentina, Bolivia, Peru and Chile with the aim of fostering research and conservation of the Andean cat.

References

External links

 
 
 

Leopardus
Felids of South America
Mammals of the Andes
Mammals of Chile
Mammals of Argentina
Mammals of Peru
Mammals of Bolivia
Endangered animals
Endangered biota of South America
Mammals described in 1865
Taxa named by Emilio Cornalia
Species endangered by habitat fragmentation